Intizam-ud-Daula, Ghazi Ud-Din Khan Siddiqi Bayafandi Feroze Jung II was the eldest son of Asaf Jah I Mir Qamaruddin Khan Siddiqi. He was born on 13 March 1709, his mother is Saidunisa Begum, the daughter of a Sayyid nobleman at Gulbarga. He died in Aurangabad on 16 October 1752.

Biography 
In 1748, Asaf Jah I died and a family feud for the Nizamship ensued. Nasir Jung, second son of Asaf Jah I was overseeing the affairs of Deccan during the intermittent absence of Asaf Jah and claimed it for himself immediately after his death. Asaf Jah's third son Salabat Jang and grandson Muzaffar Jang were also in the fray. But Nasir Jung and Muzzafar Jung soon lost their lives and it was almost certain that Salabat Jang will inherit the position of Nizam.

Meanwhile, Ghazi ud-Din rose to the status of Captain General during the reign of Ahmad Shah Bahadur. Ghazi ud-Din didn't like being sidelined and goaded the Mughal emperor to give a farman proclaiming him subedar of Deccan. Then with the help of Maratha forces decided to stake his claim. In return for the military help, he offered the Maratha forces full power over the Khandesh and five hundred thousand rupees. He reached Deccan during the month of October, 1752 with a full force from Delhi. But died soon after under mysterious circumstances; some say he was poisoned.

Before retiring to the Deccan, He installed his eldest son Ghazi ud-Din Khan Feroze Jung III better known as Imad-ul-Mulk in the Mughal court who played a crucial role in the politics of Delhi for next several years.

References

Mughal nobility
1752 deaths
18th-century Indian monarchs
18th-century Indian Muslims
Year of birth unknown